Dave Durden is an American swimming coach. Durden has been the men's swimming head coach at University of California, Berkeley since 2007.  In 2018, USA Swimming selected Durden as the Head Coach for the 2020 US Olympic Men's Swimming Team.  In 2016, Durden was selected as a men's assistant coach for the US Olympic Swimming Team.  He was also named Coach of the Meet at the 2016 US Olympic Swimming Trials. In 2015, Durden served as head coach of the US Swimming team at the World Championships in Kazan, Russia. He previously worked as an assistant coach Dave Salo's Novaquatics and an assistant coach to Dave Marsh at Auburn University.

References

American swimming coaches
Living people
Year of birth missing (living people)